"Sophie" is a song by New Zealand band Goodshirt. The track became the band's only New Zealand number-one single in May 2002 and was the 18th-highest-selling single of the year there.

Music video
Filmed in a continuous take, the music video shows a young woman listening to music on headphones, unaware that burglars (played by Goodshirt) are behind her, stealing everything in her flat. The video won Best Music Video at the 2003 New Zealand Music Awards.

Track listing
New Zealand CD single
 "Sophie" (album version)
 "Green" (demo)
 "Melobeeda" (full length version)

Charts

Weekly charts

Year-end charts

References

Goodshirt songs
2001 songs
2002 singles
Number-one singles in New Zealand